The Du Quoin Call was an American daily newspaper published in Du Quoin, Illinois. In 1987, the paper was acquired by Hollinger. Former owner GateHouse Media purchased roughly 160 daily and weekly newspapers from Hollinger in 1997.
The Call covered Du Quoin, Perry County, and the county seat of Pinckneyville.

The Call ceased publication in July 2022.

References

External links 
 

Newspapers published in Illinois
Perry County, Illinois
Publications established in 1895
Gannett publications